The Kasganj level crossing disaster was the crash of a passenger bus with an express train near the town of Kasganj in Uttar Pradesh, India on 4 June 2002.

Overview 

The accident occurred at around 1.00 pm in the tiny village of Chandi, when a local bus, carrying around 60 people between villages, came to a level crossing near Kasganj. The bus driver started to drive his vehicle through the manned crossing barriers, which were open to road traffic, onto the crossing in front of the on coming express train. The front half of the bus was thrown into a nearby canal, where it rapidly sank, drowning all those inside not killed in the initial crash.

49 people, all on the bus, died as a result of the accident and another 29 were injured, 7 of them seriously.

Aftermath 

The statutory investigation report  cited the fact that the manned crossing barriers were open to road traffic and not interlocked to protecting rail signals; it also identified that the train was dispatched in violation of standing instructions.

See also 
 Uttar Pradesh train accidents
 List of road accidents

References

External links 
 BBC News Report

Bus incidents in India
Level crossing incidents in India
2002 road incidents
Railway accidents in 2002
Kasganj
Railway accidents and incidents in Uttar Pradesh
History of Uttar Pradesh (1947–present)
June 2002 events in India
2002 disasters in India